FC Winterthur is a Swiss football club based in Winterthur, Canton of Zürich. They play in the Swiss Super League, the first tier of Swiss football, and appeared regularly in the Nationalliga A during the 20th century. Their home is the Stadion Schützenwiese.

History

The club was founded in 1896 by students of the local school of engineering and following a fusion with two local teams, it was called Vereinigte Fussballclubs Winterthur between 1929 and 1946. They enjoyed their best success in the early part of the 20th century winning the Swiss Championship three times (in 1906, 1908 and 1917), before consecutive relegations in 1931 and 1934. They played in the lower leagues until regaining promotion to the Nationalliga B in 1950. They have since stayed in the second division for most of their history, except for several appearances in the Nationalliga A, from where they were most recently relegated in 1978 following a promotion ten years prior. Notable managers from this period include Gabet Chapuisat, Wolfgang Frank, René Hüssy, Timo Konietzka, and Willy Sommer

They famously lost to West Auckland F.C., an English amateur team in what is thought to be the first international football club competition, the Sir Thomas Lipton Trophy. The club have also reached the final of the Swiss League Cup in 1972 and 1973 and Swiss Cup in 1968 and 1975, however lost on every occasion.

In 2005–06 season the club finished 14th place in the Challenge League. Despite performing poorly in the league, they made it to the semi finals of the Swiss Cup by defeating Grasshoppers, Lucerne and Servette, before losing to eventual winners Sion at home.

In the 2021–22 season, Winterthur were able to achieve a last round championship victory in the Swiss Challenge League, to gain their first promotion to the Swiss Super League. It will be the first time since 1982 that the team played in the top Swiss football league. It is their fourth victory in the second Swiss football league. Following their promotion, coach Alex Frei, who led the team during this successful season, departed the team to join FC Basel, along with assistant coach Davide Callà. They're replaced by Bruno Berner and Aurélien Mioch.

Players

Current squad

Out on loan

Former players

Stadium

The club play at Stadion Schützenwiese, a short walk from the centre of Winterthur, having done so since their inception in 1896. The first grandstand was built in 1922, and then replaced in 1957 using sponsorship money.

In the 1980s the ownership was transferred to Winterthur council as the club faced financial problems. The council are responsible for any maintenance and upkeep.

While once boasting a capacity of 14,987 before 2009, the stadium now holds 8,550 seats, 1,900 of which are seated. The more hardcore supporters of the club stand at one end, which is known as the Bierkurve. They also have a small stand for younger supporters known as the Sirupkurve. Away supporters are housed at the opposite end of the stadium to the Bierkurve.

Honours
 Swiss Super League
Winners (3): 1905–06, 1907–08, 1916–17
 Swiss Challenge League
Winners (4): 1965-66, 1967-68, 1981-82, 2021–22

Former coaches
  Martin Rueda (2000–2001)
  Walter Grüter (2001)
  Urs Schönenberger (2001–2002)
  Ivan Koritschan (2002–2003)
  Hans-Joachim Weller (2003)
  Gianni Dellacasa (2003–2004)
  Mathias Walther (2004–2009)
  Boro Kuzmanović (2009–2014)
  Jürgen Seeberger (2014–2015)
  Alex Frei (2021–2022)
  Bruno Berner (2022–)

See also

References

External links

 Official website 
 "Bierkurve Winterthur" supporters club 
 "Laufpass" – Fanzine 
 Soccerway.com profile
 Football.ch profile 

 
Football clubs in Switzerland
Association football clubs established in 1896
Winterthur
1896 establishments in Switzerland